Gamja-ongsimi or potato dough soup is a variety of sujebi (hand-pulled dough soup) in Korea's Gangwon cuisine. Both the potato dumplings (or potato balls) and the soup can be referred to as gamja-ongsimi. The juk (porridge) made with potato balls as its ingredient is called gamja-ongsimi-juk, and the kal-guksu (noodle soup) made with the potato balls is called gamja-ongsimi-kal-guksu.

Etymology and history
Gamja means potatoes, and ongsimi is a Gangwon dialect word for saealsim (literally "bird's egg", named for its resemblance to small bird's eggs, possibly quail eggs), which is a type of dough cake ball often made with glutinous rice flour and added to porridges such as patjuk (red bean porridge) and hobak-juk (pumpkin porridge). Originally, gamja-ongsimi was made into small balls as saealsim, but nowadays it is also made into bigger, less globular, and more sujebi (hand-pulled dough)-like shapes.

Preparation
Potatoes are grated, drained, squeezed, and mixed with the potato starch settled at the bottom of drained water in a bowl. The potato dough is balled into ongsimi, and boiled in anchovy-dasima broth with vegetables such as aehobak (Korean zucchini), shiitake mushrooms, shepherd's purse, and red chili peppers. The soup is often topped with gim-garu (seaweed flakes), toasted sesame seeds, and optionally white and yellow al-gomyeong (egg garnish).

Gallery

See also 

 Kal-guksu
 Silesian dumplings
 List of potato dishes

References 

Korean soups and stews
Potato dishes